Dora River is a watercourse that is located in Greater Newcastle in the Hunter region of New South Wales, Australia.

Course and features
Dora Creek River rises below Watagan Mountains west of Martinsville, and flows generally southeast by south, joined by two minor tributaries, before reaching its river mouth within Lake Macquarie, near the town of Dora Creek. The river descends  over its  course.

The merged flows of Dora Creek together with Lake Macquarie reaches the Tasman Sea of the South Pacific Ocean at Swansea.

The F3 Freeway crosses the creek, west of Morisset.

See also 

 Eraring Power Station
 List of rivers of Australia
 List of rivers of New South Wales (A–K)
 Rivers of New South Wales

References

External links
 

 

Rivers of New South Wales
Central Coast (New South Wales)
Rivers of the Hunter Region